Admiral of Castile was the representative of the King of Castile at the head of the Navy. It was a dignity created in 1247 that lasted until 1705.

Admiral of Castile 
The title of Admiral of Castile was created by King Ferdinand III the Saint in 1247 for the successful Siege of Seville, appointing Ramón de Bonifaz to that position. 
After the conquest of Seville, this title was covered with great authority, power and pre-eminence, which are specified by Alfonso X the Wise in the Siete Partidas. The Admiral resided in Seville, because the Royal Shipyards were constructed there and it was the place where the fleets were armed and organized and where the special maritime court was also located. Among the multiple attributions and powers of the admiral, they included having a voice and casting vote in the Council of Castile.

From 1405 to 1705, this position became the heritage of the Enríquez family, descendants of the infante Fadrique Alfonso, natural son of King Alfonso XI of Castile. The first of this family to hold the Admiralty was Alfonso Enríquez, by concession of Henry III of Castile.

In the fifteenth century, the institution of the Admiral of Castile lost its importance. The Admiral became a palace man and  stopped participating personally in the naval wars, while the Castilian navy was transformed, replacing the royal galleys with private sailing ships, hired for each campaign.

Admirals of Castile 

The following is a list of people who held this title:

References

Sources 
Spanish Army